Georgia State Route 3E may refer to:

 Georgia State Route 3E (Atlanta–Marietta): A former state highway that traveled in Atlanta and Marietta
 Georgia State Route 3E (Thomaston): A former state highway that traveled in Thomaston

0003E